is a Japanese anime television series produced by Toei Animation. It is the twentieth installment in the Pretty Cure franchise, released in commemoration of the franchise's twentieth anniversary. Koji Ogawa serves as chief director, with Ryunosuke Kingetsu as head writer, and Atsushi Saitō as character designer. It began airing on all ANN stations in Japan beginning February 5, 2023, succeeding Delicious Party Pretty Cure in its initial timeslot. The series' main theme is "heroism", while it uses the Sky as the main motif.

Story
Sora Harewataru is a resident of the otherworldly kingdom , who decided to go to the main city to watch the celebration of the first birthday of the kingdom's only princess: Elle. However, the evil  Underg Empire shows up to abduct the baby princess for their evil purposes. Although Sora takes up arms against the Underg Empire to stop the abduction, she and Elle accidentally crash land into another world, in a city called , where they are found and rescued by Mashiro Nijigaoka, a middle school student, and her grandmother Yoyo. Now, Sora must return the favor in her shoes to get Elle back home to her parents with Mashiro's help as Pretty Cures while defending the human world against the Underg Empire.

Characters

Pretty Cures
 / 

One of the two main protagonists, Sora is a 14-year-old girl from Sky Land. She always loves to train hard to become just like her hero who saved her when she was young. Sora came to Sorashido City when trying to save Elle from Kabaton, one of the Underg Empire's generals and moved into Mashiro's house as Mashiro's guest. With the Sky Tone's power, she can transform into Cure Sky, the Pretty Cure of the sky. Her theme color is blue.

 / 

One of the two main protagonists, Mashiro is a 14-year-old girl from Sorashido City. She's a Half-Skylandian, whose grandmother, Yoyo, once live in Skyland until she move to the Human World. She currently lives with her as her parents were often busy working overseas. She has some knowledge about cooking and nature. With the Sky Tone's power, she can transform into Cure Prism, the Pretty Cure of light. Her theme color is white.

 / 
 
A 12 year old boy, who is also a bird fairy from Sky Land's PuniBird tribe, he is the first male Pretty Cure in the franchise to be part of the main lineup. Tsubasa is a hard worker, who likes Ellee-chan. Tsubasa transforms into Cure Wing His theme color is orange.

 / 

An 18 year old adult girl who is childhood friends with Mashiro. Ageha always does her very best, and gets along with everyone she meets. She is a fashionable, very reliable, and cheerful older sister type. She came to Sorashido City to attend a vocational school to become a nursery school teacher. Ageha transforms into Cure Butterfly, she is the first adult-aged Pretty Cure in the franchise. Her theme color is pink.

Sky Land

Elle is a one-year-old princess of Sky Land. She alongside Sora came to Sorashido City when she is kidnapped by Kabaton, one of the Underg Empire's generals. She is able to create Sky Tones for the cures to transform.

Elle's father and one of the rulers of Sky Land.

Elle's mother and one of the rulers of Sky Land.

Underg Empire
The  are the series' main antagonists. Their goal is to kidnap Elle due to her ability to create Sky Tones but their true motives remain a mystery.

Generals

The first Underg general to appear in the series, Kabaton is a rowdy pig-like Underg general who believes that strength is everything. His catchphrase is

Monsters

They are the main monsters of the series. They are summoned by the Underg generals, using the power of the Underg Energy by saying . They say  when they are purified by the Cures.

Cures' family members

Mashiro's grandmother, she is a Skylandian Scholar who settled into Sorashido City as part of her research on the Human World.

Mashiro's father, who is currently working overseas.

Mashiro's mother, who is currently working overseas.

Other characters

Mashiro's childhood friend, an 18-year old girl living in Sorashido City who dreams to become a teacher. She is kindhearted and sisterly, and has a soft spot for younger children. Ageha is also one of the few people who knew both Sora and Mashiro's identities as Pretty Cure.

A female student who appears in Mashiro's school. Her dream is to become an illustrator.

A female student who appears in Mashiro's school. Her dream is to become a civil servant.

A male student who appears in Mashiro's school. His dream is to become a CureTuber.

Development
The series' trademark was first confirmed by Toei back in November 2022 with an official website launching on the same date. Information for the series is later updated on January 8, 2023, revealing the main characters, with three of them confirmed to be voiced as well as the series' setting and theme.

Takashi Tanaka of the Asahi Broadcasting Corporation said the theme of "heroism" was to honor the series' twentieth anniversary, saying that: "However, this time, we dared to choose 'hero' as the theme. This is the 20th installment of the Pretty Cure series, which started with Futari wa Pretty Cure. In the history of Pretty Cure, which evolves and expands in various ways, what I have continued to draw in, is the appearance of the girls who have carved out a difficult path with their own hands and stood at the forefront to encourage everyone. I chose this theme with that thought in mind." He also said the following:The main character, Sora, is a girl who yearns to be a hero. With the desire to become a hero, she pushes forward beyond the boundless blue sky. She will grow while discovering a "hero". Through her, I would like to carefully draw a Pretty Cure-like hero image. To dream, to never give up, to forgive others, to believe in friends, to be positive. Working hard, and sharing that moment... Series creator and producer Takashi Washio also stated in an interview the following regarding the series:The Pretty Cure series, which started with Futari wa Pretty Cure in 2004, has reached its 20th work! I think it was only thanks to everyone's support that I was able to do it.Thank you very much.Thank you from the bottom of my heart. Now, Pretty Cure has been crowned with many themes and motifs so far, but this work is the theme is a "hero", and "sky" is the motif. The endless "sky", a magnificent world that is clear and blue and full of transparency. The main character of this work is the character that embodies the "sky" that you imagine."The voice actors for the main characters commented on their roles in the series. Akira Sekine said "I will cherish this baton that I received from all the seniors who were involved in Pretty Cure, and I will do my best to spread courage and energy to everyone together with Sora! I will!" Ai Kakuma, who voiced Rabirin in Healin' Good Pretty Cure, said "I was in charge of voicing Rabirin's for Healin' Good Pretty Cure for a year, but all the time and experience I had with Pretty Cure became my treasure." Aoi Koga, notable for voicing Paimon in Genshin Impact, said on her role in the series "Even before I became a voice actor, it was my dream and goal to appear in the Pretty Cure series, so I was incredibly happy. I couldn't calm down, thinking, 'Isn't this still a dream?' I was grateful to be able to be involved in the work I longed for, and to be able to live in the world as Elle-chan, and face each episode with care. I think so!" On February 2, the voice actors for both Cure Wing and Cure Butterfly were revealed in an official press release. Cure Butterfly was revealed to be the first adult-aged Pretty Cure while Cure Wing is the first time a male Pretty Cure is part of the main lineup. Washio stated in that press conference, when asked by a reporter, "I have said before that once the era passes, Pretty Cure will not be limited to women, but I wonder if this is the right time. This year is also the 20th anniversary year, so I would like to ask for everyone's cooperation. However, I decided that a male Pretty Cure should appear.""

Media

Anime
Soaring Sky! Pretty Cure officially airs on all ANN stations in Japan beginning February 5, 2023. Ami Ishi performs the series's opening theme  while Chihaya Yoshitake performs the ending theme . Erika Fukasawa composes the music for the series. Toei Animation Inc. licensed the series outside Japan, with Crunchyroll simulcasting the series in North America, Central and South America, the Caribbean, Brazil, South Africa, Australia and New Zealand the same day it premiered.

Episodes

Film

A theatrical film titled  will premiere in Japanese theaters on September 15, 2023. Part of the Pretty Cure All Stars series of films, commemorating the franchise's 20th anniversary, it will feature all Pretty Cure teams from all 20 series.

Merchandise
Bandai Namco Holdings (under the Bandai branding) handles merchandising for the series, which all includes toys and also related goods. A spinoff of the Pretty Holic line titled Pretty Holic Stationary, will also be released in the same date the anime's airing.

Manga
A manga adaption series by the Futago Kamikita twins began serialization in the March 2023 issue of Kodansha's Nakayoshi magazine.

Notes

References

External links
 Official website
 Official website (Asahi)
 

Pretty Cure
2023 anime television series debuts
Angels in television
Crunchyroll anime
Magical girl anime and manga
Toei Animation television
TV Asahi original programming